The Georgy Hut (Romansh: Chamanna Georgy, German: Georgyhütte or Georgy's Hütte) is a mountain hut in the Swiss Alps, located on Piz Languard, above Pontresina. At 3,175 metres above sea level, it is the highest mountain hut in the canton of Graubünden.

See also
List of buildings and structures above 3000 m in Switzerland

References
Swisstopo topographic maps

External links 
Official website 
Georgy Hut on Hikr

Mountain huts in Switzerland
Buildings and structures in Graubünden
Mountain huts in the Alps